The 2006 Sukma Games, officially known as the 11th Sukma Games was a Malaysian multi-sport event held in Kedah from 28 May to 4 June 2006. Negeri Sembilan weightlifter Zulkifli Che Rose and Negeri Sembilan swimmer Lew Yih Wey were announced as Best Sportsman and Best Sportswoman of the event respectively.

Development and preparation
The 11th Sukma Games Organising Committee was formed to oversee the staging of the event.

Venues
The 2006 Sukma Games used a mix of new and existing venues. Most venues were existing public-sporting facilities, while others were newly constructed venues. Some retrofitting work were done in venues which are more than a decade old. They will be revert to public use after the games.

At the centrepiece of the activities was the upgraded 40,000-seat Darul Aman Stadium which hosts most of the events. A games village was not built, instead athletes and officials were housed in Universities throughout Kedah. Besides being physically near to the sport venues, it was hoped that it will add vibe to the city and reduce post-games costs in converting a dedicated games village to other uses.

The 11th Sukma Games had 24 venues for the games. 12 in Kota Setar, 4 each in Kuala Muda and Kubang Pasu respectively and 1 each in Langkawi, Padang Terap and Pendang respectively.

Marketing

Logo

The logo of the 2006 Sukma Games is an image of a human in movement which represents the activeness and fitness of the athletes participating at the games. The colour Yellow and green represents the games host state, Kedah, the colour red represents the fighting spirit of the athletes and colour blue represents the greatness and sincerity of the athletes.

Mascot
The mascot of the 2006 Sukma Games is a nameless Eagle. It is said that the eagle is the state bird of Kedah and one of the prevalent species in Kedah especially in Langkawi where an eagle sculpture was erected in the Eagle Square (Dataran Helang) to symbolise the island. The adoption of eagle as the games' mascot is to represent the fighting spirit of the athletes participating at the games.

Motto
The official motto of the games is "Sukan Cemerlang Negara Terbilang"  which means Excellence in sports, Glorify the nation.

The games

Participating states

 
 
 
 
 
 
 
 
 
 
 
 
 
 
  Police

Sports

Medal table

Broadcasting
Radio Televisyen Malaysia was responsible for live streaming of several events, opening and closing ceremony of the games.

Concerns and controversies
 On 28 May 2006, the Kedah state team lost a Gold medal after it was found out that Linvern Lim Yu Zheng represented Kedah as a Negeri Sembilan citizen. The Kedah state team deliberately took him for the Swimming event and was found not to obey the Games rules. Lim Yu Zheng previously represented Negeri Sembilan in the two previous Sukma Games.
 On 4 June 2006, An athlete failed a doping test.
 On 28 May 2006, a power shortage occurred at several Sukma Games venues in Kedah. At the Mount Keriang Aquatic Centre, the electronic scoreboard suffered some damage when the diving event was about to begin at 11 am. At the Squash centre in Muadzam Shah Sports Complex, the power shortage occurred at 4:40 pm, which caused the following events to be delayed.

References

External links
 
 11th Sukma Games Utusan Website

Sukma
2006 in multi-sport events
Sport in Kedah
Sukma Games